Dactyloscopus boehlkei is a species of sand stargazer native to the coastal waters around the Bahamas, Cuba and the Lesser Antilles where it can be found at depths of from .  It can reach a maximum length of  SL. The specific name honours the American ichthyologist James Erwin Böhlke (1930-1982) who was curator of fishes at the Academy of Natural Sciences of Philadelphia.

References

boehlkei
Fish described in 1982
Taxa named by Charles Eric Dawson